Baja is a genus of ferns in the subfamily Cheilanthoideae of the family Pteridaceae with a single species Baja brandegeei, synonym Cheilanthes brandegeei. The species is native to Baja California including the offshore Cedros Island, Mexico.

References

Pteridaceae
Flora of Baja California
Flora of Baja California Sur
Endemic flora of Mexico